John Daniel Lazar is a former Major League Baseball pitcher. He pitched in parts of two seasons, 1968 and 1969, for the Chicago White Sox. An alum of Indiana State University, Lazar was elected to the ISU Hall of Fame in 2008 and inducted in 2009.

Twice he was named an All-ICC pitcher for the Sycamores; he led them in strikeouts and wins from 1963–65, he continues to hold the strikeouts record (single-game) at 16.

References

External links

Sources

Major League Baseball pitchers
Chicago White Sox players
Florida Rookie League White Sox players
Sarasota White Sox players
Clinton C-Sox players
Indianapolis Indians players
Lynchburg White Sox players
Evansville White Sox players
Hawaii Islanders players
Tucson Toros players
Baseball players from Indiana
Indiana State Sycamores baseball players
1943 births
Living people